Marko Barun (born 7 January 1978 in Slovenia) is a Slovenian professional footballer who last played for Aris Limassol F.C. in Cypriot First Division.

External links

1978 births
Living people
Slovenian footballers
Association football defenders
NK Maribor players
NK Železničar Maribor players
NK Olimpija Ljubljana (1945–2005) players
Slovenian expatriate footballers
Expatriate footballers in Cyprus
Apollon Limassol FC players
Ermis Aradippou FC players
Aris Limassol FC players
Slovenian PrvaLiga players
Cypriot First Division players